WLES (590 kHz) is a commercial AM radio station licensed to Bon Air, Virginia, serving the Greater Richmond Region.  WLES is owned and operated by Stuart Epperson, through licensee Truth Broadcasting Corporation.  It airs a Christian radio format, as part of "The Truth Network."

This station was once licensed to Lawrenceville, near the Virginia-North Carolina border. It had been a daytimer station on AM 580, with an oldies format.  The station moved to the suburbs of Richmond to serve that larger radio market, now at AM 590 with authorization to broadcast around the clock.  Programming is also heard on FM translator station W249CI at 97.7 MHz.

Technical information

Chesapeake-Portsmouth Broadcasting filed a request in July 2007 to transfer the license of WLES to Truth Broadcasting, headed by her son Stu Epperson, Jr., but withdrew the request in August 2007.

Subsequently, a construction permit request was filed to conduct a frequency swap with nearby station WLVA, which is owned by Truth Broadcasting and operates on the adjacent frequency 590 kHz. The swap was completed in 2011. The station was issued a license to operate on 590 kHz on March 28, 2014.

Effective May 21, 2019, Chesapeake-Portsmouth Broadcasting sold WLES to Truth Broadcasting Corporation for $75,000.

Translator
In addition to the main station, WLES is relayed by an FM translator.

References

External links
 WLES-AM 590 Online

Radio stations established in 1959
LES
Talk radio stations in the United States
1959 establishments in Virginia